The Schoolyard is a Canadian short film, directed by Chloé Leriche and released in 2007. The film stars Robert Naylor, Jean-Carl Boucher and Antoine Marcotte as Tommy, Manu and Fabrice, three young boys who decide to confront their school bully, only to discover his own hidden reasons for bullying others.

The film premiered at the 2007 Toronto International Film Festival. It was later named to TIFF's annual year-end Canada's Top Ten list of the year's best Canadian short films.

References

External links

 

2007 films
Canadian drama short films
Quebec films
French-language Canadian films
2000s Canadian films